Karakaya is a Turkish surname. Notable people with the surname include:

Dudu Karakaya (born 1985), Turkish female middle-distance runner
Feridun Karakaya (1928-2004), Turkish actor
Mevlüt Karakaya (born 1963), Turkish politician
Murat Karakaya (born 1987), Turkish male volleyball player
Şenol Karakaya (born 1992), Turkish painter
Tuğba Karakaya (born 1991), Turkish female middle-distance runner
Tevhit Karakaya (born 1955), Turkish businessman and politician
Tuncay Karakaya (born 1989), Turkish Paralympian goalball player

Turkish-language surnames